Helmut Schwichtenberg (born 5 April 1942 in Żagań) is a German mathematical logician.

Schwichtenberg studied mathematics from 1961 at the FU Berlin and from 1964 at the University of Münster, where he received his doctorate in 1968 from Dieter Rödding. He then worked as an assistant and then as a professor in Münster, and since 1978 has been professor of mathematical logic at the Ludwig-Maximilians-Universität Munich (successor of Kurt Schütte). 

Schwichtenberg deals with, among other things, proof theory, theory of computability, lambda calculus and applications of logic in computer science. He is a member of the Bavarian Academy of Sciences.

Selected publications

 

 

References

External links
 Homepage at Ludwig-Maximilians-Universität Munich

German logicians
1942 births
University of Münster alumni
Living people
Free University of Berlin alumni
Ludwig Maximilian University of Munich alumni